The American Football Conference (AFC) is one of two conferences within the National Football League, the National Football Conference (NFC) being the other.  The AFC has its roots in the American Football League (AFL), which began to play in 1960.  In 1970, the AFL merged with the NFL.  As part of the merger, the former AFL teams, plus three former NFL teams (the Baltimore Colts, the Cleveland Browns and the Pittsburgh Steelers), were placed into the AFC.  The remaining former NFL teams were placed in the NFC.

Background
The AFL or AFC champion is not necessarily the team with the best record in the regular season.  Rather, the champion is decided by the AFC Championship Game (formerly the AFL Championship Game) as part of the post-season playoffs involving the teams with the best regular season records.  The Houston Oilers won the first two AFL championships, in 1960 and 1961.  The only other team to win two consecutive AFL championships prior to the merger was the Buffalo Bills, who won in 1964 and 1965 with future United States Congressman, HUD Secretary and Vice-Presidential nominee Jack Kemp at quarterback.  The first team to win three consecutive AFL or AFC championships was the Miami Dolphins in 1971 through 1973.  The only team to win four consecutive AFL or AFC championships was the Buffalo Bills in 1990 through 1993.  The New England Patriots are the only other AFC team to win three consecutive championships, from 2016 through 2018.

Through the 2019 season, the most AFL or AFC championships won by any team is eleven, by the Patriots.  The Pittsburgh Steelers and Denver Broncos each have eight AFC championships.  The Buffalo Bills won six AFL or AFC championships and the Miami Dolphins and Oakland/Los Angeles Raiders have each won five AFL or AFC championships.  The Raiders have also been the AFL or AFC runner up, as a result of losing the AFL or AFC Championship Game, a record nine times.  The Steelers have been the runner up eight times, while the Los Angeles/San Diego Chargers have been the runner up seven times.

The record for the most regular-season wins by an AFL or AFC champion is 16, by the 2007 New England Patriots, with a perfect 16–0 record.  No AFL or AFC champion has won exactly 15 games.  Seven AFL or AFC champions have won 14 games, including two Miami Dolphins teams and three New England Patriots teams (2003, 2004, 2016).  Six of the teams that won 14 games did so in a 16-game season.  Only the 1972 Miami Dolphins won 14 games in a 14-game season, with their perfect 14–0 record.

Bill Belichick has been the head coach for nine AFC championship teams, which is a record.  Belichick coached the New England Patriots to AFC championships in 2001, 2003, 2004, 2007, 2011, 2014, 2016, 2017 and 2018.  Don Shula has been the head coach of five AFC championship teams.  Shula coached the Miami Dolphins to AFC championships in 1971, 1972, 1973, 1982 and 1984.  Chuck Noll and Marv Levy each coached four AFC champions. Hank Stram and Dan Reeves each coached three AFL or AFC champions.

Tom Brady has been the starting quarterback for nine AFC championship teams, more than any other quarterback.  Brady was the starting quarterback for the 2001, 2003, 2004, 2007, 2011, 2014, 2016,  2017 and 2018 New England Patriots.  In addition, he was the starting quarterback for one NFC championship team, the 2020 Tampa Bay Buccaneers, for a total of 10 conference championships.  John Elway was the starting quarterback for five AFC champions.  Elway was the starring quarterback for the 1986, 1987, 1989, 1997 and 1998 Denver Broncos.  Terry Bradshaw, Jim Kelly and Peyton Manning were each the starting quarterback for four AFC champions.  Manning started for 2 two championships each for two different franchises, the Indianapolis Colts and the Broncos.

Franco Harris and Thurman Thomas were each the leader in rushing yards for an AFC champion four times.  Larry Csonka was the leader in rushing yards for an AFC champion three times.  Andre Reed was the leader in receiving yards for an AFC champion four times.  Paul Warfield and Julian Edelman have been the leader in receiving yards for an AFC champion three times.

The 1973 Miami Dolphins had seven first-team All-Pros, more than any other AFC champion since the NFC/AFC merger.  The 1971 Miami Dolphins, 1979 Pittsburgh Steelers and 2007 New England Patriots each had five 1st team All-Pros.  The 1970 Baltimore Colts, 1982 Miami Dolphins, 1987 Denver Broncos and 1996 and 2001 New England Patriots did not have any 1st team All-Pros.  Jack Ham is the only defensive player to be named as a 1st team All-Pro for four AFC champions.  Ham was a 1st team All-Pro for the 1974, 1975, 1978 and 1979 Pittsburgh Steelers.  Troy Polamalu was a defensive 1st team All-Pro for three AFC champions with the Steelers between 2005 and 2010.  Larry Little is the only offensive lineman to be named as a 1st team All-Pro for three AFC champions, the 1971–1973 Miami Dolphins.  Rob Gronkowski is the only tight end to be named a 1st team All-Pro for three AFC champions, for the Patriots between 2011 and 2017.  Garo Yepremian is the only kicker to be named as a 1st team All-Pro for two AFC champions, the 1971 and 1973 Miami Dolphins.

At the end of the 1966 season, the Super Bowl began to be played between the AFL champion and the NFL champion.  After the AFL/NFL merger in 1970, the Super Bowl continued to be played between the AFC champion and the NFC champion.  The AFL champion lost the first two Super Bowls.  The 1968 AFL champion New York Jets with Joe Namath at quarterback became the first AFL team to win the Super Bowl.  Starting with that Super Bowl, the AFL or AFC champion won 11 out of 13 Super Bowls.  However, the AFC champion lost 13 consecutive Super Bowls, from the 1984 AFC champion Miami Dolphins through the 1996 AFC champion New England Patriots.  Overall, the AFL or AFC champion has won 27 of the 55 Super Bowls played through the end of the 2018 season.

Key

AFL/AFC championship teams

Footnotes 
Lou Rymkus began the 1961 season as the Houston Oilers' head coach.  After the Oilers started the season with a 1–3–1 record, Wally Lemm took over as head coach.  The Oilers won all nine games with Lemm as their head coach and went on to win the 1961 AFL Championship Game.
Bob Griese began the 1972 season as the Miami Dolphins' starting quarterback.  After Griese suffered an ankle injury in the 5th game of the season, Morrall became the starting quarterback for the remainder of the season and ended the season with more passing attempts than Griese.  Morrall started the AFC Championship game, but Griese replaced him with the Dolphins behind in the second half and led the Dolphins to the victory.  Griese then started Super Bowl VII.*
In 1972 both Larry Csonka and Mercury Morris rushed for 1000 or more yards for the Miami Dolphins.  Csonka led the team in rushing yardage, making Morris the only player on an AFC (or NFC) championship team to have at least 1000 rushing yards but not lead the team.
Tony Banks and Trent Dilfer each started 8 games for the 2000 Baltimore Ravens.  Banks is listed here because had 274 passing attempts and Dilfer had 226.  But Dilfer was the starting quarterback in the AFC Championship game and in Super Bowl XXXV.

References
General

Specific

AFC Championships
 
 
 
AFC Champions
National Football League records and achievements